"I Waited" is a song recorded by Canadian country music artist Chris Cummings. It was released in 1996 as the first single from his debut album, Somewhere Inside. It peaked at number 4 on the RPM Country Tracks chart in March 1996. The song was released in the United States in March 1998 as the second single from his American debut album, Chris Cummings, but failed to chart. It previously made an appearance on the 1996 Warner Music Group compilation New Country 3.

Chart performance

References

1996 songs
1996 debut singles
1998 singles
Chris Cummings songs
Reprise Records singles
Warner Records singles
Song recordings produced by Jim Ed Norman
Songs written by Chris Cummings